Talvin "Tab" Skinner (born September 10, 1952) is an American former professional basketball player.

Playing career

College
Skinner played basketball at the University of Maryland Eastern Shore.  In the 1972-73 season at UMES, Skinner led all players in the NAIA Championships in rebounding.

For his play during the 1973-74 Mid-Eastern Athletic Conference men's basketball tournament, Skinner was named the Most Outstanding Player.

In the 1973-74 season, Skinner and the Fighting Hawks became the first ever Historically Black College or University (HBCU) to earn an invitation to the National Invitation Tournament (NIT) post-season basketball tournament.

Professional
Skinner was drafted by the Seattle SuperSonics in the 1974 NBA Draft (8th pick of the 3rd round).  He played with the SuperSonics for two seasons, starting part of the 1975-76 season and playing in the first two post-seasons for the franchise.

Later years
Following his playing career, Skinner worked at Boeing in Seattle, Washington.  More recently, he was hired to work as a player development aide with the Seattle Storm.

References

External links

1952 births
Living people
American men's basketball players
Basketball players from Maryland
Maryland Eastern Shore Hawks men's basketball players
People from Berlin, Maryland
Seattle SuperSonics draft picks
Seattle SuperSonics players
Small forwards